Adasse (fl. 1348) was a Jewish money lender from Görlitz, modern-day Germany, who was granted citizenship of the town . 

It was rare for either a woman or a Jew to be granted citizens rights in the fourteenth century; the fact that Adasse was both means she is a significant figure. She gained notoriety in the town as a creditor, lending money to members of the Christian community in particular. At the time of her citizenship, she was the owner of a promissory note for 71 marks. Although a citizen, Adasse would still have been excluded from council elections.

References 

Money lenders
14th-century German Jews
14th-century German women
Year of birth unknown
Year of death unknown
Medieval Jewish women
Medieval businesswomen
14th-century German businesspeople